Ctenotus youngsoni, also known commonly as the Shark Bay south-west ctenotus and Youngson's ctenotus, is a species of skink, a lizard in the family Scincidae. The species is endemic to Australia.

Etymology
The specific name, youngsoni, is in honour of Australian zoologist William Kenneth Youngson.

Geographic range
C. youngsoni is found in the Australian state of Western Australia.

Habitat
The preferred natural habitat of C. youngsoni is shrubland.

Description
C. youngsoni has well-developed limbs, with five toes on each of its four feet.

Reproduction
C. youngsoni is oviparous.

References

Further reading
Cogger HG (2014). Reptiles and Amphibians of Australia, Seventh Edition. Clayton, Victoria, Australia: CSIRO Publishing. xxx + 1,033 pp. .
Kay GM, Keogh JS (2012). "Molecular phylogeny and morphological revision of the Ctenotus labillardieri (Reptilia: Squamata: Scincidae) species group and a new species of immediate conservation concern in the southwestern Australian biodiversity hotspot". Zootaxa 3390: 1–18.
Storr GM (1975). "The Genus Ctenotus (Lacertilia, Scincidae) in the Kimberley and North-west Divisions of Western Australia". Records of the Western Australian Museum 3 (3): 209–243. (Ctenotus youngsoni, new species, pp. 227–228).
Storr GM, Smith LA, Johnstone RE (1999). Lizards of Western Australia. I. Skinks, Revised Edition. Perth: Western Australian Museum. 291 pp. .
Wilson S, Swan G (2013). A Complete Guide to Reptiles of Australia, Fourth Edition. Sydney: New Holland Publishers. 522 pp. .

youngsoni
Reptiles described in 1975
Taxa named by Glen Milton Storr